Northfleet is a town in the borough of Gravesham in Kent, England. It is located immediately west of Gravesend, and on the border with the Borough of Dartford. Northfleet has its own railway station on the North Kent Line, just east of Ebbsfleet International railway station on the High Speed 1 line.

The area
Northfleet's name is derived from being situated on the northern reach of what was once called the River Fleet (today known as the Ebbsfleet River). There is a village at the other end of the river named Southfleet. It has been the site of a settlement on the shore of the River Thames adjacent to Gravesend since Roman times. It was known as Fleote by the Saxons c. 600 AD, Flyote c. 900 AD, and Flete c. 1000 AD. It was recorded as Norfluet in the Domesday Book, and Northflet in 1201. By 1610 the name of Northfleet had become established. A battle took place during the Civil War at the Stonebridge over the Ebbsfleet river. Northfleet became a town in 1874 with the Northfleet Urban District Council being established c. 1894. In 1974 it was merged with the adjacent Borough of Gravesend. The first council offices were off the Hill, but the council then moved to Northfleet House (now a nursing home for the elderly). Northfleet House was once the home of Thomas Sturge who owned a local cement works. Northfleet was in the lathe of Aylesford and the hundred of Toltingtrough.

Romans lived in the area now known as Springhead, which they called Vagniacae. Springhead, the source of the Ebbsfleet River, was the first site in Britain where watercress was grown commercially in the early 19th century. Watling Street, a Roman road which forms the basis of the A2 from London to Dover, bisects the area.

Local Businesses
Northfleet has many independent small businesses. American themed Hot Rod Diner the High Street has become something of an attraction since taking on the site from the G&M Used Car Sales business. Another popular eatery is and Polish themed White Eagle or Dominos Pizza are both situated at the Hill, Northfleet. There are a number of vibrant pubs in the area including the Rose Pub, The Leather Bottle and Ye Old Coach and Horses. A number of cafes including Costa Coffee, Cafe of Northfleet and Golden Grill are popular with locals.

History

Rosherville Gardens

In 1815 the first steamboat started plying between Gravesend, Kent, and London, an event which was to bring much prosperity to the area. The number of visitors steadily increased, and in the course of the next ten years several new and rival steam packets were started. The regular service given by the steam packets led entrepreneurs to establish amenities for the entertainment of visitors, one of which was Rosherville Gardens.

George Jones laid out the gardens in 1837 in one of the disused chalk pits, covering an area of 17 acres (69,000 m2). Their full title was the 'Kent Zoological and Botanical Gardens Institution'. They occupied an area in what was to become Rosherville New Town (see below).

Robert Hiscock, in his A History of Gravesend (Phillimore, 1976) describes them thus:
They were a place of surpassing beauty and a favourite resort of Londoners. Adorned with small Greek temples and statuary set in the cliffs, there were terraces, and archery lawn, Bijou theatre, and Baronial Hall for refreshments, and at one time a lake. At night the gardens were illuminated with thousands of coloured lights and there were fireworks displays and dancing. Famous bands such as the American Sousa were engaged during the season. Blondin, the trapeze artist, performed ... In 1857 as many as 20,000 visitors passed  through the turnstiles in one week. By 1880 the gardens had reached the peak of their popularity ... in 1901 they were closed.
During a brief revival 1903–1911, they were used in the making of early films.
A pier was built to carry these crowds ashore, and a railway station opened on the Gravesend West branch railway. It was one of the steamboats from Rosherville Gardens that was involved in a horrific accident in 1878. The  passenger steamer, after leaving Rosherville pier, was in a collision with the collier Bywell Castle, from Woolwich. 640 people died from the collision, 240 being children. An inquest was held at Woolwich, but no conclusive reason was ever established as to the cause of the disaster at the Devils Elbow on the Thames.

Rosherville New Town

Joseph Rosher gave his name to a building scheme which began with the building of new houses in 1830. A prospectus states that ' this spot will ultimate become to Gravesend what St Leonards is to Hastings and Broadstairs to Margate'. That grandiose scheme did not materialise in quite that way, but the area of Northfleet still bears that name.

Northfleet Harbour
Northfleet Harbour is formed from a natural river inlet of the River Ebbsfleet into the Thames.  The Harbour formed over solid chalk, and created a marine facility that was originally used by the Romans.  Remains of Roman buildings have been found further up the River Ebbsfleet, and during the High Speed 1 railway works, evidence of Saxon occupation was also found.  By the 18th century, a flour mill was placed within the Harbour, and later it was home to the cement industry.  A local community Trust is now aiming to restore the harbour and bring it back into public use.

Northfleet during the Second World War
On Friday, 16 August 1941 150 German aircraft flew through the Kent skies, to deal the worst blow to civilian life the county had experienced to that point in the war. With the formation splitting into groups to be variously challenged from Manston, Kenley, Hornchurch, Biggin Hill and Hawkinge airfields, a group of Dorniers made it to Northfleet a little after midday. They dropped about 106 bombs ranging from 50 to 250 kilos over the town. The bombs killed 29 people, injured 27, and badly damaged two schools.

Governance
Northfleet Urban District Council was set up under the Local Government Act of 1894. Within its boundaries were the hamlets of Northfleet Green and Nash Street, as well as the now built-up Perry Street; and the later estates at Shears Green, Istead Rise and Downs Road. Northfleet was merged, inter alia, with Gravesend to become Gravesham District Council on 1 April 1974.

Industry and commerce

With its situation on a busy waterway such as the River Thames, at a point where higher land came close to the river, it was an obvious place for industry to be located. The river provided water supplies and the means whereby raw materials and products could be transported. The forests of the area provided timber for various aspects of most industries. It was an area famous for Gun Flint manufacturing as Flint is found in amongst the Chalk. Flint was also used as a local building material. Flint walls can still be found in the area. The Springhead/Ebbsfleet Valley area was used for the growing of Watercress much of which supplied the London market.

Cement

The Romans first began to dig chalk from the area, but the making of cement came later. The industry requires plentiful water supplies, and chalk as its main ingredient, both of which were to hand. When in 1796, James Parker set up kilns on Northfleet creek to make his Roman cement, it was the beginning of a large complex of cement works along this stretch of the river. The manufacture of Portland cement began in April 1846 when William Aspdin, son of Joseph Aspdin, its inventor, acquired Parker's works and built new kilns.

Aspdin's works became Robins & Co in 1853, sold on to the Associated Portland Cement Manufacturers (APCM) in 1900, which was taken over by the Lafarge Group in 2001.  By 1900, there were nine cement works operating on the Thames between Swanscombe and Gravesend. The last cement plant in Northfleet ceased operation in 2008.

Now under water, one of the largest chalk pits, known locally as The Blue Lake, can be found between the A226 and the North Kent Railway line. It is about 200 metres south of the access tunnel to the old (now demolished) Lafarge cement plant, that runs under the North Kent / Channel Tunnel rail-link railway lines.

Paper
Northfleet is the location of a large Bowaters (later Bowater-Scott and Kimberly-Clark) paper mill built in 1923 and makes all of the main – line Andrex toilet tissue.

Metals
Britannia Refined Metals (now part of the Glencore group) has a refinery producing lead and silver.

Northfleet Dockyard
Northfleet was by 1800 the home of numerous shipyards which had produced many fine vessels. One such yard was owned by Thomas Pitcher, a shipwright, laid out in 1788. A list of merchant vessels built at his yard included at least 25 ships for the East Indies and West Indies services, and about the same number for the Navy. There is a fine model of such a ship in St. Botolph's Church. In 1839 the company was in the hands of Pitcher's sons William and Henry. The docks were in decline by 1843, and Pilcher's yard finally closed in 1860.

Cable works

Another large employee of labour in Northfleet was the cable works. Originally Henley's, now AEI, they occupied the land originally once used by the Rosherville Gardens. The PLUTO pipeline used in WW2 was built here.

AEI Cables closed in 2005 and Henley moved in 2006. The Henley works were completely demolished by 2010. The area is currently being redeveloped by Keepmoat Homes under the name Cable Wharf.

Transport
Northfleet has its own railway station, which opened in 1849 as part of the extension of the North Kent Line from Gravesend to London. Train services at the station are operated by Southeastern and Thameslink.

Ebbsfleet International station
Ebbsfleet International railway station, on the High Speed 1 line (also known as the Channel Tunnel Rail Link), is located less than a mile from Northfleet. Ebbsfleet International is served by Eurostar trains and by Southeastern's Javelin trains, both running to and from London St Pancras.

A design flaw that exists in Ebbsfleet International is its lack of pedestrian connections to Northfleet. Although the station's domestic passenger entrance is within a quarter of a mile of Northfleet's local station, the walking distance between the two is greater, hindering the advantage of living in Northfleet over nearby Gravesend, which is served by both Southeastern's Metro and High Speed trains. It should also be noted that Gravesend railway station is closer to much of Northfleet's residential areas, as opposed to its own station. Furthermore, full station facilities including Access For All, are available at Gravesend and not at Northfleet

Education
Non-selective secondary schools serving Northfleet include Northfleet School for Girls and Northfleet Technology College (Boys).

Northfleet churches

The ancient parish church of Northfleet (dating from the 14th century, but with work from earlier periods) is dedicated to St Botolph. Its tower was built in 1717, after the original had fallen. The church contains a 14th-century carved oak screen, which is thought to be the oldest in Kent. Rosherville St Mark's Church is now part of the Team ministry with St. Botolph's church. The other active church in Northfleet is All Saints, Perry Street which is Anglo Catholic. All Saints Perry Street is the largest Anglican parish in Gravesham Borough with a quarter of the Gravesham population living within its boundaries.

The Roman Catholic church, Our Lady Of The Assumption designed by Giles Gilbert Scott and with its tower foreshadowing his Liverpool Cathedral, is built entirely of brown brick. It was constructed in 1914 on the site of a former Tram Depot. During WW2, and the blitz, the German Air Force used the tower of the Church as a guide into London. The pilots used the tower as a reference point for direct access into London.

There is a United Reformed Church (URC) on Dover Road in Northfleet. The Dover Road Chapel was opened on Wednesday 20 June 1850 as a Congregational Church. Northfleet URC is grouped with three other churches in the North Kent URC group. These are St Paul's URC, Singlewell Road, Gravesend; Hartley URC and Southfleet URC.

Culture and community

Rotary Club in Northfleet
The Rotary Club of Northfleet was founded in 1954 and chartered as the Rotary Club of Northfleet – Club No 793 in R.I.B.I. District 1120. The club originally had members from many local industries (cement, engineering, paper making etc.), but as these industries declined along the river front, so membership changed.  The club used to meet at lunchtime for many years, but this changed to evening meetings a few years ago.  Northfleet Rotary Club, like most Rotary clubs also voted to accept women into Rotary membership, which is by invitation.
The club's name was changed in 2005 to Northfleet with Ebbsfleet Rotary Club, to reflect the emerging growth of nearby Ebbsfleet area, with its developing infrastructure of Bluewater shopping complex, new High Speed Rail terminal at Ebbsfleet Station, and commercial and residential properties being developed as part of the wider development the Thames Gateway project.

Sports

Ebbsfleet United Football Club

Gravesend & Northfleet FC was formed through amalgamation in 1946 of Gravesend United FC and Northfleet United FC which prevented the almost certain bankruptcy of the latter. Gravesend (being by far the larger of the two towns, in terms of population), was always going to be the first name of the new club. Although one would suppose Gravesend to be the main influence in the history of this club, as it was listed first when the towns' clubs merged, it was in fact Northfleet that was to be responsible for the early significant accomplishment of the association football club now known as Ebbsfleet United F.C.. As of the start of the 2022-2023 season, Ebbsfleet are in the National league South.

Northfleet Football Academy
Northfleet Football Academy was started in 2009 by local school Northfleet Technology College. Northfleet Football Academy was designed to recruit the elite of Graveshams football players and give them the best possible coaching to help them develop as players. It also offers its participants the opportunity to take a BTEC in Sports and one other additional subject like Science to help the players gain nationally recognised qualifications at key stage 4 whilst the players develop their playing skills. The academy is run by Northfleet Technology College teachers Brian Meaney (manager) and Lisa Donaldson (chairman) and also boasts the professional coaching of former Welsh international and current Ashford Town manager Steve Lovell. The academy is based in Colyer Road, Northfleet.

Fleet Leisure Football Club
Fleet Leisure F.C. were a Non-League football team who played in the Kent Invicta Football League. The team were originally based at Nelson Road, and then groundshared with Rochester United F.C. For the 2014-15 season the club changed its name from Fleet Leaisure to Gravesham Borough. The 2016–17 season saw the club enter the FA Cup for the first time in their history when they entered the competition in the preliminary qualification round. They folded prior to the 2018–19 season after being unable to raise the funding required to continue playing.
The club name has been continued by Gravesham Borough Youth Football Club.

Gravesham Borough Football Club
Gravesham Borough F.C. were a non-League football team who played in the Southern Counties East Football League. The team was originally based at Nelson Road, then groundshared with Chatham Town F.C.

Northfleet Urban Country Park
Northfleet Urban Country Park sits on the eastern side of Northfleet, on Thames Way opposite the new police station, bounded by Springhead Road & Vale Road. The site is 10.5 hectares and provides a variety of wildlife habitats.

Notable people from Northfleet
 Stan Aldous (19231995), football player.
 Cyril Beldam (18691940), cricket player.
 Hilda Braid (19292007), actress.
 Arthur Gouge (18901962), aircraft engineer.
 Arthur Greenslade (19232003), arranger and conductor.
 Simon Hinks (born 1960), cricket player.
 Thomas Pitcher (1745-1837), shipbuilder 
 William Charles John Pitcher, (18581925), theatre costume and scenery designer.
 Richard Southwood (19312005), zoologist.
 Thomas Sturge (1786-1866), merchant and cement manufacturer

References

 Hiscock, Robert H (1796) A History of Gravesend, Phillimore. 
 Lewis, Samuel (1831) A Topographical Dictionary of England: Comprising the Several Counties, Cities, Boroughs, Corporate and Market Towns, Parishes, Chapelries, and Townships, and the Islands of Guernsey, Jersey, and Man, with Historical and Statistical Descriptions; Illustrated by Maps of the Different Counties and Islands; a Map of England ... and a Plan of London and Its Environs ... :in Four Volumes. (Lewis)
 Jessup, Frank W. (1966) Kent History Illustrated, Kent County Council.

External links

Northfleet Harbour Restoration Trust – information about Northfleet's ancient harbour
Northfleet History Group – open to those with an interest in Northfleet's history
Details of the Northfleet cement works

Towns in Kent
Port of London
Populated places on the River Thames
Unparished areas in Kent